Michael Obert (born 1966) is a German book author and journalist who has been compared with the likes of Bruce Chatwin, Jon Krakauer and Ryszard Kapuściński. His debut movie Song from the Forest was honored with the Award for Best Feature-Length Documentary at the International Documentary Film Festival Amsterdam 2013. In 2016 Song from the Forest was considered for the 88th Academy Awards.

Obert is currently based in Berlin.

Journalism 
As a journalist Michael Obert reports mainly from Africa and the Middle East and writes for a wide range of prestigious periodicals in Germany, Switzerland and Austria, such as Sueddeutsche Zeitung Magazin, GEO, Zeit Magazin, Die Zeit, Frankfurter Allgemeine Zeitung. Obert´s work is also published by international media like Sunday Times Magazine, Courrier International, GQ France, The Journal (New York),  Dagens Næringsliv (Oslo) and Himal Southasian (Kathmandu).

Literature 
In his travelogue Regenzauber (On the River of Gods), published by German National Geographic Editions, he describes traveling for seven months on Africa’s third longest river, the Niger, from its source in the rainforest of Guinea, 2,600 miles through the Sahel and Southern Sahara, into the mouth of the Niger at the Bay of Benin.

In Die Raender der Welt (The Edges of the World), a selection of Obert’s finest literary travel writing, he explores 25 lost locations often overlooked by travelers so far, including war zones like Afghanistan, Sudan, Nigeria, but also forgotten paradises such as the Cook Islands, Papua New Guinea, and Bhutan.

In Chatwins Guru und ich (Chatwin´s Guru and Me) Obert, a self-described modern nomad, follows in the footsteps of the nearly hundred-year-old writing vagabond, Patrick Leigh Fermor. To find this mentor, Obert travels from Berlin via Vienna to Bratislava, through Hungary, Serbia, Rumania, Bulgaria, Macedonia and Albania before reaching the southern Peloponnese. Along the way, he gets to know what is, for him, an unfamiliar part of the world.  His encounters become part of a portrait of Eastern Europe that is as personal as it is poetic.

Michael Obert´s literature is not yet published in English language.

Film 
Song from the Forest, Michael Obert´s debut movie, tells the story of American Louis Sarno who has lived among the Bayaka pygmies (also Aka people) in the central African rainforest for 25 years and travels with his son, 13-year-old pygmy boy Samedi, to New York City.

The film premiered at the International Documentary Film Festival Amsterdam 2013  where it was honored with the Award for Best Feature-Length Documentary. The film also won the 2014 Grand Prix at Planete+Doc International Film Festival in Warsaw  and was nominated for the Golden Eye Award for Best International Documentary Film at the Zurich Film Festival 2014. In 2016 Song from the Forest was considered for the 88th Academy Awards.

Bibliography (selection) 
Chatwins Guru und ich. Meine Suche nach Patrick Leigh Fermor (2009 Malik Verlag), 
Die Ränder der Welt. Patagonien, Timbuktu, Bhutan&  Co. (2008 Malik Verlag) 
Regenzauber. Auf dem Fluss der Götter (2003 Droemer Verlag)

Filmography 
 2013: Song from the Forest, written and directed by Michael Obert - Documentary film,  world premiere:  International Documentary Film Festival Amsterdam 2013.

Awards (selection) 
 2018: European Press Prize, Distinguished Reporting Award for The Human Catcher
 2017: Pulitzer Center on Crisis Reporting, International Journalism Grant 
 2017: Amnesty International Media Award for Human Rights for The Curse of the White Skin (Der Fluch der weißen Haut)
 2016: Considered for the 88th Academy Awards with Song from the Forest
 2016: Shortlist Journalist of the Year, European Diversity Awards London 2016 
 2015: German Documentary Film Award for Song from the Forest
 2015: Nominated for European Press Prize, Distinguished Writing Award, with Boko Haram. The rise, beliefs and power of Africa’s most feared terrorist group
 2014: Grand Prix, Planete+Doc International Film Festival Warsaw for Song from the Forest 
 2014: Nominated for Henri Nannen Award
 2014: Hansel-Mieth-Prize (10 best stories of the year)
 2013: IDFA Award for Best Feature-Length Documentary for Song from the Forest, International Documentary Film Festival Amsterdam 2013 
 2013: Otto Brenner Award for Critical Journalism 
 2013: Lighthouse Award for Outstanding Journalistic Work 
 2013: Shortlisted for European Press Prize, News Reporting Award 
 2013: Hansel Mieth Prize (10 best stories of the year) 
 2012: German Reporter Prize
 2012: Hansel Mieth Prize (10 best stories of the year) 
 2011: Hansel Mieth Prize (10 best stories of the year) 
 2009: Sangam House Writers´ Residency, Pondicherry, India
 2009: Hansel Mieth Prize (10 best stories of the year) 
 2008: Ledig House Writers´ Residency, New York
 2008: Herbert Breiter Scholarship, Greece
 2005: Globetrotter Literature Award

References

External links
 www.obert.de (author´s page)
 www.facebook.com/obert.michael (author´s Facebook page)
 www.songfromtheforest.com (SONG FROM THE FOREST official website)

Living people
1966 births
German male writers
European Press Prize winners